Jean-Jacques Burnel (born 21 February 1952) is an English musician, producer and songwriter, best known as the bass guitarist and co-lead vocalist with the English rock band The Stranglers. He is the last founding member to remain in the band.

Life and career

Jean-Jacques Burnel was born in Notting Hill, London, to French parents. His family owned a restaurant where his father worked as a chef. As a child, as the son of French immigrants, he was often the victim of mockery from his schoolmates, which later led him to call himself John to disguise his French origins. This early encounter with xenophobia would also have an impact on his explosive temper in life and on stage as well as on the way he plays.

He moved with his parents to Godalming, Surrey, when he was 12 years old and attended the Royal Grammar School, Guildford, subsequently reading history at the University of Bradford and Huddersfield Polytechnic. Burnel originally trained as a classical guitarist, but adopted the bass guitar as his instrument within The Stranglers. He has provided lead vocals on nearly a third of the band's songs, though Burnel later explained he often sang lyrics written by Hugh Cornwell (or vice versa) depending on "who had the best voice for that particular song."

Burnel has been a member of the Stranglers since the group's inception in 1974, but has also made two solo albums: Euroman Cometh in 1979, and Un Jour Parfait in 1988, as well as a collaborative album with fellow Stranglers member Dave Greenfield, Fire and Water (Ecoutez Vos Murs) in 1983. Burnel has also produced and appeared as a guest musician for a number of artists, such as Lizard and ARB from Japan, Polyphonic Size (from Belgium) and Taxi Girl's album Seppuku in 1981, as well as Laurent Sinclair's "Devant le Miroir" maxi single. Burnel also formed a rhythm and blues covers band, the Purple Helmets, who played a number of concerts and released two albums in the late 1980s.

As a holder of French citizenship, Burnel received his call-up papers for national service in France. He succeeded in avoiding it with a novel defence, arguing that his absence would indirectly damage the Stranglers as a band, and therefore the careers of the other members. This was in accordance with Burnel's claim that only the "bourgeois" would ever agree to serve their country's military.

Burnel composed and performed music for the anime Gankutsuou: The Count of Monte Cristo, including both the opening and ending themes, "We Were Lovers", and "You Won't See Me Coming" respectively.

Burnel is fluent in French and writes many of his songs in the language.

Equipment and sound

Burnel is noted for his distinctive bass guitar sound and melodic bass lines. These are particularly prominent on earlier Stranglers recordings produced by Martin Rushent, such as the hit singles "No More Heroes" and "Peaches".

In the early days, Burnel's distinctive aggressive sound was created using a Fender Precision Bass with RotoSound roundwound strings played with a plectrum very close to the bridge, through Hiwatt all-valve amplification. However, the defining factor was the use of a Marshall 4x12 speaker cabinet in which the speaker cones were ripped, creating a distorted sound.

Later, he used a Yamaha BB2000, a Steinberger L2 (headless), and a Kinkade acoustic bass. He currently plays Shuker JJ Burnel signature basses custom-built in England by Jon Shuker.

He was one of the first bass guitarists to use Trace Elliot amplification when the company began production in 1980. He now uses amplification by Ashdown Engineering who have honoured him with his own JJ500 signature amps.

Personal life
As of 2015, Burnel was a 7th degree black belt (nanadan) in Shidokan Karate and is head of Shidokan UK. He is also a motorcyclist and has owned many Triumph motorbikes.

Discography

The Stranglers

Albums
 Euroman Cometh (1979) No. 40 (UK Albums Chart)
 Fire and Water (Ecoutez Vos Murs) (with Dave Greenfield) (1983) No. 94 (UK Albums Chart)
 Un Jour Parfait (1988)
 Gankutsuou: The Count of Monte Cristo – Original Soundtrack (with Kasamatsu Kouji) (2005)

Singles
 "Freddie Laker (Concorde & Eurobus)" (1979), B-side "Ozymandias"
 "Girl from the Snow Country" (1981) deleted prior to release due to dispute with record label, but also released as a bootleg on "Karate Records".
 "Rain & Dole and Tea"/"Consequences" (1984) (with Dave Greenfield)
 "Goebbels, Mosley, God & Ingrams" (1988) flexi-disc release of an outtake from Euroman Cometh sessions
 "Le Whiskey"/"El Whiskey" (1988)
 "Reves"/"Crazy (She Drives Me)" (1988)

Production and other appearances
Burnel has also produced and or appeared either as a member of the group (Mutations, Purple Helmets) or as a ‘guest’ musician on a number of recordings, as follows:
 Celia and the Mutations – "Mony Mony / Mean to Me" single (1977) : bass and backing vocals
 Celia and the Mutations – "You Better Believe Me" single (1978) : bass
 Lizard – Lizard album (1979) : production, backing vocals
 Lizard – TV Magic single (1980) : production
 Polyphonic Size – "Nagasaki Mon Amour" single (1980) : production
 Sirens – "It Doesn't Really Matter" single (1980) : production
 Taxi Girl – "Les Armees de la Nuit" single (1981) : production & original theme
 Taxi Girl – "Vivian Vog" single (1981)
 Taxi Girl – "La Femme Ecarlate" single (1981) : production
 Taxi Girl –  "Les Armées de la Nuit"/"Musée Tong"/"La Femme Ếcarlate" single (1981) : production
 Taxi Girl – Seppuku album (1981) : production, chorus vocals on UK bonus track "Find the Boy"
 Polyphonic Size – Live for Each Moment album (1982) : production, bass and backing vocals, lead vocals on two tracks, joint composer of one track
 Polyphonic Size – "Winston & Julia"/"Je T'ai Toujours Aimée"/"Parties Dance" single (1982) : production, lead vocals on all tracks, bass on "Je T'ai Toujours Aimée"
 Polyphonic Size – "Mother's Little Helper"/"Men and Construction"/"RDA RFA"/"Kyoto"/"Nagasaki Mon Amour" single (1982) : production
 Polyphonic Size – Mother's Little Helper"/"Girlscout"/"Men and Construction"/"On the Way to Medora"/"Saison" single (1982) : production
 Polyphonic Size – "Night is Coming On" single (1982) : production
 Polyphonic Size – "Je T'ai Toujours Aimee" single (1982) : production, lead vocals and bass on A-side
 Polyphonic Size – Walking Everywhere album (1983) : production, vocals on three tracks which he jointly composed, including lead vocals on Walking Class Hero.
 Polyphonic Size – "Walking Class Hero" single (1983) : production, lead vocal, joint composer
 ARB – Yellow Blood album (1984) : bass guitar on two tracks, "Yellow Blood" and "Fight it Out"
 Beranek – Trigger album (1984) : production, bass and backing vocals on track "All Through the Night"
 Beranek – "Some Boys Like Dolls"/"Why Don't You Wanna Dance" single (1984) : production
 Play Group – Love Goes Round album (1984) : production
 Laurent Sinclair – "Devant le Miroir" single (1985) : production and bass
 Dave Howard Singers – "Rock On" single (1985) : production
 Beranek – Daylight in the Dark album (1986) : production, bass and backing vocals
 Beranek – "Dancing in the Wind"/"Teardrop" single (1986) : production, bass and backing vocals
 Ping Pop – Just Another Lazy Day album (1986) : production and backing vocals
 Fools Dance – "They'll Never Know" single (1987) : bass
 Jacques Dutronc – CQFD album (1987) : bass on five of the tracks
 Mona Mur – Mona Mur album (1987) : production, bass, guitars and percussion
 Mona Mur – "Bastard" single (1987) : production, bass, guitars and percussion
 Mona Mur – "Ritz" single (1987) : production, bass, guitars, percussion
 Revenge – Sweet and Sour album (1987) : production, sound mixing and recording, backing vocals
 Revenge – Wartime album (1987) : mixing
 The Purple Helmets – Ride Again album (1988) : bass and vocals
 The Purple Helmets – "We Gotta Get Out of This Place"/"I’m a Man" single (1989) : bass and vocals
 The Purple Helmets – Rise Again album (1989) : bass and vocals
 The Purple Helmets – "Brand New Cadillac"/"Under the Sun" single (1989) : bass and vocals
 Dani – N Comme Never Again album (1993) : production, mixing, bass, vocals and guitars
 Magic De Spell – Holiday in Sarajevo album (1993) : production
 Magic De Spell – Nipsonanoimimata Mi Monan Opsin album (1995) : production	
 Pat Dinizio – Songs and Sounds album (1997) : bass and vocals
 Pat Dinizio – "124mph" single (1997) : bass and vocals
 Pat Dinizio – "A World Apart" single (1997) : bass and vocals
 Schindler – "Time" single (1999) : production, keyboards and backing vocals
 Temple of Sound - "Dojo kun (jamais laisser tomber)" on the album First edition (2002) : vocals
 3 Men and Black – Acoustic album (2004) : bass and vocals
 Teasing Lulu – "Infatuation"/"You Ain't My Baby" single (2006) : production
 Teasing Lulu – "Waste of Time"/"The Ex Factor" (from the motion picture 'Reverb') single (2007) : production
 Teasing Lulu – Black Summer album (2008) : production
 Dani - "Me & you" on the album Le Paris de Dani (2010) : vocals, song written by JJ

References

Bibliography

 Buckley, David. No Mercy – The Authorised and Uncensored Biography of The Stranglers. London. Hodder and Stoughton. 1997.

Further reading
 Cornwell, Hugh, A Multitude of Sins. London. Harper Collins Publishers, 2004. 
 Cornwell, Hugh and Drury, Jim. The Stranglers – Song by Song. London. Sanctuary Publishing Ltd. 2001

External links
Ode to Joy: Issue 4; The Burning Up Times PDF: free online publication devoted to JJ Burnel's 1979 debut album, Euroman Cometh. 30 years on, JJ Burnel and John Ellis are interviewed, alongside fans' live Eurotour reviews and exclusive images
 JJ Burnel & Stranglers interviews, news and reviews at www.strangled.co.uk

1952 births
Living people
The Stranglers members
People from Notting Hill
People educated at Royal Grammar School, Guildford
English bass guitarists
English male guitarists
Male bass guitarists
English songwriters
English male singers
English new wave musicians
English record producers
British male karateka
English people of French descent
Alumni of the University of Bradford